Lust for Life is a 1922 German silent romantic comedy film directed by Johannes Guter and starring Ressel Orla, Elga Brink, and Walter Janssen.

The film's sets were designed by the art director Erich Czerwonski.

Plot summary

Cast

References

Bibliography

External links
 

1922 films
Films of the Weimar Republic
German silent feature films
Films directed by Johannes Guter
German black-and-white films
1922 romantic comedy films
German romantic comedy films
Silent romantic comedy films
1920s German films